Al Marqab is a subject of Baladiyah al-Batha and one of the oldest neighborhoods of Riyadh, Saudi Arabia. Bordered by al-Dirah neighborhood to the west, it is separated by the Al Madinah Al Munawwarah Road from al-Oud and al-Salhiyah neighborhoods in the south. The early traces of its existence dates back to 16th century, which nearly corresponds with the final stages of the disintegration of Hajr al-Yamamah that resulted in the succession of several settlements from the former.

References 

Neighbourhoods in Riyadh